Andrew Patrick Donaghy (born 1942) is a Republican politician who was elected and currently serves in the Vermont House of Representatives. He represents the Rutland-1-1 Representative District.

References

1942 births
Living people
Republican Party members of the Vermont House of Representatives
Date of birth missing (living people)
Place of birth missing (living people)
People from Rutland County, Vermont